The C.V.I. was an automobile manufactured in Jackson, Michigan by the C.V.I. Motor Car Company from 1907 to 1908.  The C.V.I. had a common chassis shared between a roadster or their touring car.  The car had a four-cylinder, 4.2L engine, with a three-speed selective transmission and shaft drive.  The cars sold for $4,000.

References
 

Defunct motor vehicle manufacturers of the United States
Motor vehicle manufacturers based in Michigan
Defunct manufacturing companies based in Michigan